The Armenia men's national 3x3 team is a national basketball team of Armenia, administered by the Basketball Federation of Armenia.
It represents the country in international 3x3 (3 against 3) basketball competitions.

See also
Armenia national basketball team

References

Armenia national basketball team
Men's national 3x3 basketball teams